A Simple Story is a 1978 French drama film directed by Claude Sautet. It was nominated for the Academy Award for Best Foreign Language Film at the 52nd Academy Awards. For her role as Marie, Romy Schneider won the 1979 César Award for Best Actress.

Plot
Finding herself pregnant at the age of 39, Marie has an abortion without telling her lover Serge, because she has decided she must live without him. Her mother disapproves and so does Gabrielle, one of her workmates. When made redundant, Gabrielle's husband Jérôme takes an overdose but Marie and Gabrielle save his life. To save his job, Marie looks up her ex-husband Georges, who says he will find Jérôme a place. This he does and, when his lover is away, Marie sleeps with him. However, Jérôme's confidence is gone and Georges has to let him go. When he admits this to Marie, she leaves him. After Jérôme in total despair kills himself, Gabrielle moves in with Marie, who finds herself pregnant again, this time by Georges. Going to see him, she realises there is no future with him and says nothing about her state. This time, she tells her workmates, she is going to have and bring up her baby.

Cast
 Romy Schneider as Marie
 Bruno Cremer as Georges
 Claude Brasseur as Serge
 Roger Pigaut as Jérôme
 Arlette Bonnard as Gabrielle
 Francine Bergé as Francine
 Sophie Daumier as Esther
 Éva Darlan as Anna
 Nadine Alari as La gynécologue

See also
 List of submissions to the 52nd Academy Awards for Best Foreign Language Film
 List of French submissions for the Academy Award for Best Foreign Language Film

References

External links
 

1978 films
1978 drama films
Films about abortion
Films directed by Claude Sautet
Films featuring a Best Actress César Award-winning performance
French drama films
1970s French-language films
French pregnancy films
Films with screenplays by Jean-Loup Dabadie
Films scored by Philippe Sarde
1970s French films
1970s pregnancy films